India sent its first Olympic team to the 1920 Summer Olympics in Antwerp, Belgium, some twenty years after a single athlete (Norman Pritchard) competed for India in 1900 (see India at the 1900 Summer Olympics).

Background, team selection, and logistics
In his opening remarks during a 1919 sports meet at the Deccan Gymkhana, Poona, the Gymkhana President Sir Dorabji Tata expressed a desire for India to take part in the forthcoming 1920 Olympics. He requested Governor of Bombay Lloyd George, who presided over and distributed prizes at this sports meet, to secure representation for India at the Olympics through the British Olympic Committee. As a result, in February 1920, the International Olympic Committee granted India affiliation to participate in the Olympic Games.  Thereafter, a committee comprising Dorab Tata, A S Bhagwat, Dr. A H A Fyzee, Prof Modak, S Bhoot, and three other Deccan Gymkhana members met in March 1920 to discuss India’s Olympic participation, and they decided to hold a trial meet in Poona in April 1920.

At this trial meet, the committee selected the following team to represent India at the Olympics: P.C. Bannerjee (Bengal) for sprints;  P. D. Chaugule (Belgaum, Mysore) for the 10,000 m and marathon; Sadashiv Datar (Satara, Maharashtra) for the 10,000 m and marathon; H. D. Kaikadi (Hubali) for the 5,000m and 10,000m; Dinkarrao Shinde (Kolhapur) for bantamweight wrestling; and K. Nawale (Bombay) for lightweight wrestling. Sohrab H. Bhoot was manager and Dr. A H A Fyzee was medical officer and adviser for the team.

Funding for the Olympic team came from Dorabji Tata (Rs.6,000 + Rs.2,000); the Government of India (Rs. 6,000); and donations from sportsminded residents of Bombay (Rs.7,000).

The team left Bombay on June 5 aboard the SS Mantua; it trained in London for six weeks at Stamford Bridge stadium, under English coach H. Parry; and proceeded to Antwerp. Chaugule in the marathon and Dinkarrao Shinde in wrestling put up a fairly good performance at the Games. H. D. Kaikadi appears not to have competed.

After the Games, Bhoot submitted a report mentioning that India could have future Olympic success in hockey and wrestling and made recommendations concerning technical, organisational, and training issues for future Olympic teams.  Further, the committee sending the team met again, and on the advice of Dorabji Tata, invited Dr. Noehren (Physical Director of YMCA India) to be secretary, along with A. S. Bhagwat, of the provisional Indian Olympic Committee; Dorabji Tata would serve as its president. This provisional committee sent an Indian team to the 1924 Olympics, and became the Indian Olympic Association in 1927.

Athletics

Ranks given are within the heat.

Wrestling

Two wrestlers Kumar Navale (Pune) and Dinkarrao Shinde (Shivaji Peth, Kolhapur, Maharashtra) competed for India in 1920. It was the nation's debut appearance in the sport. Navale was defeated in his first match, but Dinkarrao Shinde won in the quarterfinals to reach the semifinals before losing twice to finish in fourth.

Freestyle

References

India at the 1920 Olympics, also showing picture of India's six participants
 
 
 Fyzee Brothers Hassan-Ali (also listed as Dr. Ali Azhar Fyzee and A H A Fyzee) and Athar Ali played for India in the Davis Cup and at Wimbledon.

Nations at the 1920 Summer Olympics
1920
Olympics